DEG or deg may refer to:

Businesses and organizations
 DEG Metro Stars, an ice hockey team in Düsseldorf, Germany
 De Laurentiis Entertainment Group, an entertainment production and distribution company
 Delhaize Group (NYSE stock symbol), a Belgium-based food retailer
 German Investment Corporation (Deutsche Investitions- und Entwicklungsgesellschaft), a German finance company

In mathematics, science, and technology
Degree (angle), a measurement of plane angle
Degree (graph theory), the number of edges incident to a vertex
Degree (temperature), unit in several temperature scales
Degree of curvature, a measure of curvature used in civil engineering
Degree of a polynomial, or order, the highest degree (sum of exponents of the variables) among the terms of a polynomial expression
Diethylene glycol, an organic compound
Dielectric elastomer generator, in materials science

Other uses
 Dég, a village in Hungary
 Deg language
 Deg Hit'an, an indigenous group in Alaska
 Deg Hit'an language
 Dir En Grey
 Dora's Explorer Girls
 Degree (disambiguation)